Fernando M. Reimers is the Ford Foundation Professor of the Practice in International Education and Director of the Global Education Innovation Initiative at the Harvard Graduate School of Education. He is interested in advancing understanding of the ways schools can empower students to participate civically and economically, and to help achieve the UN Sustainable Development Goals. He served on UNESCO's Commission on the Futures of Education that authored the report Reimagining Our Futures Together. A New Social Contract for Education.

Career 
Reimers teaches courses on education policy and educational innovation that explore how to support students in developing competencies which help them improve their opportunities and quality of life, and to contribute to improve the world. He was the founding director of the International Education Policy Master's Program, a program at the Harvard Graduate School of Education that supported the development of leaders of systemic efforts to enhance the quality and relevancy of education around the world. His book One Student at a Time. Leading the Global Education Movement. is an analysis of the contributions of the graduates of this program to the Global Education Movement. This book is also available in Spanish.

His current research focuses on educational innovation and the impact of education policy, leadership, and teacher professional development on education that supports the holistic development of children and youth.  He directs the Global Education Innovation Initiative, a cross-country research and practice collaborative he founded focusing on education for the 21st century.

He has written or edited 45 academic books, including the following:

On system level change
Primary and Secondary Education During COVID-19, in Spanish
University and School Collaborations During a Pandemic, in Spanish
Education to Build Back Better
Audacious Education Purposes in Spanish
Implementing Deeper Learning and 21st Century Education Reforms in Spanish
Empowering Teachers to Build a Better World in Spanish and Portuguese
Teaching and Learning in the 21st Century, in Chinese, Portuguese and Spanish 
Preparing Teachers to Educate Whole Students in Spanish

On Educating Global Citizens—Empowering Students

Education and Climate Change. The Role of Universities in Spanish
Learning to Improve the World
Empowering Global Citizens, in Spanish and Portuguese
Empowering Students to Improve the World in 60 Lessons, in Arabic, Chinese, Italian, Portuguese and Spanish 
Teaching two lessons about UNESCO, and other lessons on Human Rights 
Learning to Collaborate for the Global Common Good

On Educational Leadership

Leading Educational Change During a Pandemic. Reflections on Hope and Possibility
Leading Education Through Covid-19: Upholding the Right to Education
Liderando Sistemas Educativos Durante la Pandemia de Covid-19
Fifteen Letters on Education in Singapore, in Spanish 
Empowering All Students at Scale, in Portuguese and Spanish 
Letters to a New Minister of Education, in Arabic, Portuguese and Spanish

Other Comparative Education Studies

Learning to Build Back Better Futures for Education
How Learning Continued During the COVID-19 Pandemic
Dialogos por un Nuevo Contrato Social para la Educacion
Advancing a New Social Contract for Education: Collaborations to Reimagine our Futures Together
Unequal Schools, Unequal Chances in Spanish
Hope or Despair 
Lectores y Ciudadanos. Desafios de la Escuela en America Latina 
Informed Dialogue, in Spanish 
Aprender Mas y Mejor

He has written a series of children's books designed to foster intergenerational conversations around values and competencies which are necessary to live well with others in a diverse and interdependent world, which have been published in eleven languages. He has also co-authored a children's book to promote ecological awareness titled The Voices of the Trees, also available in Portuguese and Spanish.

He has served on the Harvard faculty since 1998. Previous to that he worked at the Universidad Central de Venezuela, the Harvard Institute for International Development and the World Bank.
He earned Doctoral and master's degrees in education at Harvard University and obtained a Licenciatura en Psicologia at the Universidad Central de Venezuela. He received an Honorary doctorate in Humane Letters from Emerson College, a Centennial Medal Award from the Institute for International Education, and a Global Citizen Award from the US Committee for Teaching About the United Nations. He was the CJ Koh Visiting Professor at the National Institute of Education in Singapore. He is a member of the International Academy of Education and of the Council of Foreign Relations.

References

Reimers, F. (Ed). Education and Climate Change. Cham: Switzerland. Springer. 2021. (published also in Spanish).

Reimers, F. (Ed). Implementing Deeper Learning and 21st century education reforms. Cham: Switzerland Springer. 2021.

Reimers, F. Educating Students to Improve the World. Singapore. Springer. 2020. (also published in Spanish and Turkish).

Reimers, F. (Ed). Audacious Education Purposes. How governments transform the goals of education systems. Cham: Switzerland. Springer. 2020. (also published in Spanish).

Reimers, F. (Ed). Empowering teachers to build a better world. How six nations support teachers for 21st century education. Springer. 2020. (also published in Portuguese and Spanish).

Reimers, F. (Ed). Leading Education through COVID-19. Upholding the Right to Education. Independently published. 2020.

Reimers, F. (Ed). Leading Educational Change During a Pandemic. Independently publisher. 2021.

Reimers, F. (Ed). Liderando Sistemas Educativos Durante la Pandemia de Covid-19. Independently published. 2020.

Reimers, F. (Ed).  Letters to a New Minister of Education. Independently published. 2019. (Published also in Portuguese and Spanish by Organization of Iberoamerican States).

Reimers, F. and C. Chung (Eds). Preparing Teachers to Educate Whole Students: An International Comparative Study. Cambridge, MA: Harvard Education Publishing. 2018. (Published in Spanish and Arabic).

Reimers, F. et al. Learning to collaborate to advance the global common good. Independently published. 2018.

Reimers, F. Teaching Two Lessons About UNESCO and other lessons on Human Rights. Independently published. 2017.

Reimers, F. Formar Lectores y Ciudadanos. Desafios de la Escuela en America Latina. Independently published. 2017.

Reimers, F. (ed.) One Student at a Time. The challenges of global education leadership. Independently published. 2017. (Published in Spanish as Educacion Para Todos. Un Estudiante a la Vez.)

Reimers, F. et al. Empowering Students to Improve the World in Sixty Lessons.  Independently published. (Published in Arabic, Chinese, Italian, Portuguese, Turkish, and Spanish.)

Reimers, F. (ed). Empowering All Students At Scale. Independently published. 2017. (Published in Portuguese and Spanish.)

Reimers, F., V. Chopra, C. Chung, J. Higdon and E.B. O’Donnell. Empowering Global Citizens. Independently published. 2016. (Published in Spanish in 2018 and Portuguese in 2017.)

Reimers, F. and E.B. O’Donnell (eds). Fifteen Letters on Education in Singapore. (Published in Spanish Quince Cartas Sobre la Educacion en Singapur. 2016.)

Reimers, F. and C. Chung (eds). Teaching and Learning for the twenty first century. Cambridge. Harvard Education Publishing. 2016. (Published in Arabic, Chinese, Portuguese, Spanish and Turkish.)

Reimers, F. (Ed.) 2006. Aprender Mas y Mejor. Politicas, Programas y Oportunidades de Aprendizaje en Educacion Basica en Mexico. Fondo de Cultura Económica. Mexico City.

Reimers, F. (Ed.) Unequal Schools, Unequal Chances. The challenges to educational opportunity in the Americas at the end of the XX century. David Rockefeller Center for Latin American Studies. Harvard University Press. Cambridge, MA. 2000. (Published in  Spanish as Escuelas Desiguales, Oportunidades Diferentes by Editorial Arco-La Muralla. Madrid. 2002).

Reimers, F. and N. McGinn Informed Dialogue. Changing Education Policies Around the World. Praeguer Publishers. 1997. (Published in Spanish as Diálogo Informado by Centro de Estudios Educativos in Mexico. 2000).

Warwick, D. and F. Reimers Hope or Despair? Primary Education in Pakistan. Praeger Publishers. 1995.

External links
Fernando M. Reimers Web Page 
 Research Gate Fernando M. Reimers Web Page 
 Academia Fernando M. Reimers Web Page
Google Scholar Fernando M. Reimers citations
 Harvard Global Education Innovation Initiative
  Harvard International Education Policy Masters Program
Global Citizenship Education Publications
The Adventures of Filomena

Year of birth missing (living people)
Living people
Harvard Graduate School of Education faculty
Harvard Graduate School of Education alumni
Harvard Institute for International Development